The Bering tundra ecoregion (WWF ID: PA1102) is an ecoregion that covers a portion of northeastern Russia, between the Kolyma Mountains on the west, and the Bering Sea coast to the east. The area is an important stopping place for migratory birds.

Location and description 
The ecoregion stretches approximately 1,000 km on alignment from southwest-to-northeast, between the Kolyma Mountains on the west, the Bering Sea coast to the east, and Kamchatka peninsula to the south.

Climate 
The climate of Koryak is Humid continental climate, cool summer (Köppen climate classification (Dfc)). Mean precipitation is about 358 mm/year.

Flora and fauna 
The ecoregion supports flora and fauna typical of forest-tundra.  Low-lying areas may feature stunted trees and willow and alder on floodplains.  Elsewhere the ground cover is grasses, heaths, and members of the families Asteraceae, Ranunculaceae, and Rosaceae.  Mosses and lichens take over at higher elevations.  Species diversity is relatively low due to the harsh climate and the isolation of the area since glacial times.  Large mammals the include the East Siberian brown bear, the Anadyr fox, and some bighorn sheep in the highlands.  Common smaller mammals include the East Siberian ermine and the American mink.   Large colonies of migrating birds rest or nest in the area every summer and autumn.  Numbers of over 700,000 individuals and 200 species have been recorded in the ecoregion.

Protections 
There is at least one significant nationally protected area in this ecoregion, the Koryak Nature Reserve, on the northeastern region of Kamchatka, stretching from mountains to the coast.

See also 
 List of ecoregions in Russia

References 

Ecoregions of Russia
Palearctic ecoregions
Tundra ecoregions